Robert Duncan (27 November 1891 – 9 November 1984) was  a former Australian rules footballer who played with Richmond in the Victorian Football League (VFL).

Notes

External links 
		

1891 births
1984 deaths
Australian rules footballers from Victoria (Australia)
Richmond Football Club players